Face to Face 2009 was a 2009 concert tour by Elton John and Billy Joel, their first concert tour together in 7 years since Face to Face 2003. The tour originally consisted of four legs throughout the year. The last leg, in fall 2009, was cancelled due to an E. coli infection that John had picked up.

Joel stated in 2012 that he would no longer tour with John because it restrains his setlists.

Tour
The cancelled shows were rescheduled for the following year (Face to Face 2010).

The first two legs focused on arenas in the United States as would have the fourth leg, but it was cancelled. The third leg focused on the major baseball stadiums in the United States.

Tour dates

Cancellations and rescheduled shows

Setlist

Notes

External links
 Information Site with Tour Dates

References

2009 concert tours
Billy Joel concert tours
Co-headlining concert tours
Elton John concert tours